Padma Division is a proposed administrative division within Bangladesh for the southern parts of the existing Dhaka Division, comprising Faridpur, Gopalganj, Madaripur, Rajbari, and Shariatpur Districts of Dhaka Division. The headquarters of the division is to be in Faridpur. This division will be named after its affiliated river Padma.

History 
The proposed division was once under ancient Kingdom of Gangaridai. Later it was ruled by local Muslim sultans and Hindu rajas until the Mughal conquest of Bengal in the 16th century, after which many nobles and merchants from North India settled in the area. In 1582 in the reign of Emperor Akbar, the province of Bengal was formed into 33 sarkars or financial sub-divisions, and Faridpur area appears to have been included within the sarkar of Muhammad Abud and was known as Fatehabad.

In 1765 the British took over the financial administration of Faridpur, together with the rest of Bengal. The greater portion of Faridpur was then comprised within Dhaka District. In 1811 Faridpur was separated from Dacca collectorate. The district was initially known as Fatehabad.
Under British rule in 1860, the district was named as Faridpur after 12th-century Sufi saint, Shah Sheikh Fariduddin. In 1984, with the decentralization program of the Bangladesh government, Faridpur district was reorganized  into five separate districts: Rajbari, Gopalgonj, Madaripur, Shariatpur and Faridpur.

On 7 May 2017 Minister of Local Government, Rural Development and Co-operatives Khandaker Mosharraf Hossain announced that the new Division will be renamed as Padma  Division after Padma River, a major river in Bangladesh and main distributary of the Ganges, flowing generally northeast of the proposed division.

Administrative districts
The Division will be subdivided into five districts (zilas) and thence into 30 sub-districts (upazilas).

See also
Meghna Division
List of people from Greater Faridpur

References

Divisions of Bangladesh
Dhaka Division
Proposed political divisions
Proposed divisions of Bangladesh